Little Onn is a hamlet in Staffordshire, England located in open countryside  north of Wheaton Aston.

It is the location of the former Second World War airfield RAF Wheaton Aston, a training school - one of the busiest in the country - that operated between 1941 and 1947. Since being abandoned the airfield has become a pig farm but many of the original buildings remain.

References

Raven, Michael, A Guide to Staffordshire and the Black Country, Michael Raven, 2004, 0906114330.

External links
 RAF Wheaton Aston

Hamlets in Staffordshire
Borough of Stafford